Sir Age Pieters Wijnalda (Dokkum, 17 October 1712 - Haarlem, 19 October 1792) was a Dutch Mennonite teacher, minister and one of the first members of Teylers Eerste Genootschap (Teylers First or Theological Society) from 1778 until his death. He was the founder of the "Doopsgezinde Schaar" (a Mennonite institution). He had one son we know of, IJnze Wijnalda.

Age Wijnalda was the second son of Pieter Harmens and was knighted by and received a crest from the King of Great Britain for services to the crown - presumably for bravery in battle, since there is a helm on his coat of arms. He was trained at the Remonstrant seminary of Amsterdam and first served in Emden 1733-1736 before moving to Haarlem.

References and notes 

1712 births
1792 deaths
18th-century Anabaptist ministers
Dutch Mennonites
Members of Teylers Eerste Genootschap
Mennonite ministers
People from Dokkum